Hardenville is an unincorporated community in eastern Ozark County in southern Missouri, United States. It is located on U.S. Highway 160, approximately five miles east of Gainesville and five miles west of Tecumseh, which is at the north end of Norfork Lake.

The Hardenville post office (zip code 65666) was established in 1921. George S. Harden, an early postmaster, gave the community his last name.

References

External links
Hardenville store and post office

Unincorporated communities in Ozark County, Missouri
Unincorporated communities in Missouri